Angela Frautschi (born 5 June 1987) is a Swiss former ice hockey player. She was a member of the Switzerland women's national ice hockey team. She played in the 2006,  2010 and 2014 Winter Olympics. She also competed for ZSC Lions Zurich in the Leistungsklasse A (the top women's ice hockey league in Switzerland).

In 2014 Frautschi accompanied the Swiss women's Ice Hockey Team to Sochi for the Winter Olympics.

Playing career

Switzerland
In a game versus Russia at the 2012 IIHF Women's World Championship, Frautschi logged a pair of assists in a 5–2 victory, as Switzerland advanced to the semifinals.

Career stats

Olympics

References

External links
 

1987 births
Living people
Ice hockey players at the 2006 Winter Olympics
Ice hockey players at the 2010 Winter Olympics
Ice hockey players at the 2014 Winter Olympics
Medalists at the 2014 Winter Olympics
Olympic bronze medalists for Switzerland
Olympic ice hockey players of Switzerland
Olympic medalists in ice hockey
Swiss women's ice hockey defencemen
Swiss Women's League players
Sportspeople from the canton of Bern
21st-century Swiss women